Strathcona Centre was a provincial electoral district in Alberta, Canada, mandated to return a single member to the Legislative Assembly of Alberta using the first past the post method of voting from 1959 to 1971.

History
It was created in 1959 after the Edmonton district was broken up into ridings.

The historic 1959 redistribution of the provincial ridings of Calgary and Edmonton standardized the voting system back to First Past the Post. From 1926 to 1959 Calgary and Edmonton members were elected by Single Transferable Vote. The rest of the province had the option of how to count ballots. The redistribution created nine ridings in Edmonton.

The other eight ridings were Edmonton Centre, Edmonton North, Edmonton Norwood, Edmonton North East, Edmonton North West, Strathcona East, Strathcona West and Jasper West.

In 1971 the riding was split, the west part became the north part of Edmonton-Whitemud with a small portion to Edmonton-Parkallen, and the east part became Edmonton-Strathcona.

Members of the Legislative Assembly (MLAs)

Election results

1959 general election

1963 general election

1967 general election

See also
List of Alberta provincial electoral districts

References

Further reading

External links
Elections Alberta
The Legislative Assembly of Alberta

Former provincial electoral districts of Alberta
Politics of Edmonton